Orlando Clemente Varona Fleitas (December 8, 1925 – March 2, 1977) was a Cuban shortstop for the Negro league Memphis Red Sox from 1948 to 1950.

A native of Havana, Cuba, Varona was selected to represent Memphis in the annual East–West All-Star Game in 1949. He died in New York, New York in 1977 at age 51.

References

External links
 and Baseball-Reference Black Baseball stats and Seamheads

1925 births
1977 deaths
Memphis Red Sox players
Cuban expatriates in the United States
Baseball infielders